Veterans Memorial Hall and Museum (formerly known as Soldiers and Sailors Memorial Hall) one of the oldest museums in Winnebago County, is located one block west of the Rock River in downtown Rockford. Construction on the Hall began in 1901 and was finished in 1902, but dedication was delayed. On June 3, 1903, President Theodore Roosevelt. visited Rockford for the opening and dedication of what was then known as Soldiers and Sailors Memorial Hall. Although initially conceived to honor Winnebago County veterans of the Mexican War, Civil War, and Spanish-American War, supporters of the hall adapted it to honor Winnebago County veterans of all decades. Veterans Memorial Hall is one of the few veteran's memorials that is not just a monument. Veterans Memorial Hall and Museum is a living memorial to Veterans from all wars, educating the public through programing, events and outreach. It will serve as a constant reminder to the sacrifices given by brave men and women from Winnebago County and a way for generations to remember and learn about their lives. The building is administered by the Winnebago County Board.

Description
The architecture of Veterans Memorial Hall is classical Greek revival meaning that two sides are identical. The building has stairs with columns and doubles doors on the east and west sides, making them visually identical sides. Decorative façades of Indiana Bedford limestone cover all four sides of the building. Carved in the stone portico of the building on the west façade are the words "Soldiers and Sailors Memorial Hall" and the date "1902". The red tile roof is topped with a skylight. Flagpoles stand on both the east and west sides of the building and a sign acknowledging Main Street as a Blue Star Highway graces the west side garden.

The lawn on the east side of the building underwent extensive renovation in 2016. It is now home to the Armistice-Memorial to Peace, which is a memorial to honor Veterans and educate the community of past Armistice/Veterans Day events at its location as well as inform visitors about the County owned Civil War Statue mounted on a column from Rockford’s original Carnegie Library.

Veterans Memorial Hall contains three floors, including the basement, all of which are serviced by an elevator. An auditorium and stage take up most of the upper floor. Numerous museum exhibits fill the main floor and the basement level also has exhibits and conference space. The building continues to serve its original mission of honoring local veterans as a museum of all wars. The interior walls are elaborately painted with symbols and names associated with the Civil War and the Civil War veterans’ associations, The Spanish American War Veterans and the Grand Army of the Republic. Permanente exhibits include large wall mounted bronze plaques containing the names of those from Winnebago County who fought and died in the Civil War. Over time, several paintings were irreparably damaged or lost due to poor maintenance and pollution; others have been covered up or painted over.

History

Construction
The idea of a memorial to honor the veterans from Winnebago County was brought up as early as 1866 when W.P. Kinney, minister of the Second Congregational Church, proposed some sort of monument to honor the memory of the 2,109 soldiers and sailors from Winnebago County that served in the American Civil War. In March 1877, John D. Jackson made an unsuccessful proposal to the Winnebago County Board seeking $25,000 for the construction of a soldier's monument.

In 1900, the question of a Memorial Hall was put to voters of Winnebago County; the vote ended in favor of a memorial, at 6,021 to 2,757. In December of that year, Thomas G. Lawler, commander of the Garrett L. Nevius Post #1 of the Grand Army of the Republic (GAR), presented a petition with signatures from than 200 veterans requesting the county build a Memorial Hall. The petition asked that the hall not only act as a memorial for veterans of the county but also be used for other county purposes.

The building was designed by Bradley & Carpenter, a local architectural firm. Construction began in early 1901. The facades were built with Indiana Bedford limestone quarried from the Bedford, Indiana quarry. Construction of Memorial Hall was completed in 18 months for a total cost of $59,136.

Dedication
In February 1903, a committee of five including: J.B. Whitehead, Col. Thomas L. Lawler, Amasa Hutchins, Col. Arthur E. Fisher, and William Andrews, was named to draft a letter of invitation to President Theodore Roosevelt to be present at the dedication. This committee was authorized to outline the program for the day.  On June 3, 1903, a reception committee of leading citizens from Rockford and Winnebago County met Roosevelt at the train station, open carriages transported him and his party to Memorial Hall. Entering from the east side of the building, facing the Carnegie Library and the Rock River, Roosevelt took a moment to inspect and admire the interior of the building before exiting to deliver his dedication speech form a platform on the west steps. Roosevelt stepped outside the doors of the memorial at 9:31am with the prominent men of his party; including Secretary Wilson, Congressman R.R. Hitt, Charles E. Fuller, and General Benson Wood. The crowd at Roosevelt’s visit had filled the streets and people were trying to do anything just to see the president.

The president told his listeners that, "No more fitting memorial could be erected to the memory of the men who fought, than a hall such as this—a hall beautiful because of the uses to which it is consecrated." Afterward, he raised a flag which had been flown on the Milwaukee-class vessel USS Winnebago during the Civil War.

With the ceremony concluded, the presidential party returned to their carriages and took a roundabout way back to the train to wave and greet children that were lining the streets before departing Rockford 51 minutes after his arrival. Roosevelt returned to Rockford two more times; once on April 6, 1912 and again on September 26, 1917, when he addressed the troops at nearby Camp Grant during World War I.

The Hall 
On the same day that Roosevelt dedicated Memorial Hall, the local Civil War veterans held their first meeting in the building. Over the century of existence, Memorial Hall has hosted a total of over 60 different veterans or associated military groups for various events and meetings. In 1966, a large stone marker commemorating the Hall’s dedication was placed on the west side of the building in front of the entrance, and in 1973, a small garden dedicated to the veterans of the Vietnam War was added.

During the Camp Grant era the Memorial Hall, as it was still called, was on a list of suggested places for soldiers to visit. The Relief Corps and other Veteran groups served low-cost meals to soldiers and hosted social events for the soldiers in WW1 and WW2.

In November of 1944 Rockford Nevius Post 1 of the G.A.R. officially disbands and hands over control of the Hall to the VFW. Unfortunately the building continues to deteriorate and begins to fall further into disrepair.

The Hall was threatened with demolition in the 1960s when the County Board proposed to demolish the hall in favor of building a parking ramp in order to extend the parking lot located next to it. The Hall's future was assured when, in 1974, the building was named an Illinois Historical Landmark. In 1976, Memorial Hall was placed on the National Register of Historic Places in time for the United States Bicentennial. In 1978, a federal grant matched $25,000 in renovation funds for work on the heating, wiring and insulation. However, by the late 1980's, the building had deteriorated so much that it needed major renovations, repairs and modernization. A County Board committee, including Rep. Dave Winters and Peggy McGaw (wife of former Mayor Robert McGaw) was formed to develop a plan. Working with the City who provided War Memorial funds which came from the sale of Camp Grant, a four-year $1.5 million restoration project began in 1988.

Phase one included the main floor and downstairs; phase two, the landscaping and phase three: the auditorium. Under the watchful eye of architect Joe Zimmer, the building was restored to its original splendor.  In 1988, a four-year, $1.5 million restoration project began in response to the parking garage attempt and the fact the building had started to deteriorate due to lack of maintenance. In the 1980s, to help offset the costs of its upkeep, the Winnebago County Board rented the first floor offices to the Rockford Convention and Visitor's Bureau, until early 2004. During that time, in November 2001, the Memorial Hall Board of Trustees was formed to oversee the Hall, its maintenance and its exhibits, as well as to author a report on future operations. In January 2005, Memorial Hall was officially reopened to the public for guided tours. 

Exhibits include the 18 bronze plaques containing the names of those from Winnebago County who fought and died in the Civil War, along with memorabilia form veterans extending from the Civil War to the current Iraq conflict. Some unique articles on display include a commemorative plaque cast of metal from the wreck of the USS Maine, artifacts from a local soldiers time serving the Philippine-American War and Mexican–American War, and items form a local Air Force veterans that spent 6 years at the Hanoi Hilton. Other artifacts from 20th & 21st century veterans are on display, with a constant rotation of smaller exhibits.

The Future 
Many veterans, political and military-associated groups have taken advantage of the facilities for post meetings, workshops and celebrations. The hall is used as a center for many public social events for Rockford including weddings, dances, parties, and even funerals. Veterans Memorial Hall continues to host the Annual Veterans Dinner, now approaching its 80th year. Currently, Memorial Hall has a large collection of more than 10,000 items, covering all war and/or conflicts, branches of service, and personal items from the men and women who have served. For instance, personal journals from soldiers serving in the Civil War and the Philippine-American War and letters home from almost every conflict soldiers have served in. Owing to this collection of artifacts and the way they have been preserved, historians from all over still use this building as an information center and a focus for research and discovery. In 1899 the idea of a memorial was strongly supported by the people of Rockford and the dedication service was a colossal boost in the growing industrial city. For decades, Veterans Memorial Hall was one of the most celebrated buildings in all of Rockford; this historical symbol continues to serve as a place of commemoration and dedication. Memorial Hall is a fundamental part of the city’s historical collection and continues to be one of the most historical buildings in Rockford.

See also
 74th Illinois Infantry Regiment

References

External links
 
 Veterans Memorial Hall at Rockford Area Convention & Visitors Bureau
 Monuments and Memorials Tour, Rockford's Main Street District

Buildings and structures in Rockford, Illinois
Illinois
Illinois in the American Civil War
Monuments and memorials on the National Register of Historic Places in Illinois
National Register of Historic Places in Winnebago County, Illinois
Spanish–American War memorials in the United States
Tourist attractions in Rockford, Illinois
Buildings and structures completed in 1903
1903 establishments in Illinois